Manhattan Cycles is a live album by the Revolutionary Ensemble, violinist Leroy Jenkins, bassist Sirone and drummer Jerome Cooper, which was recorded on the last day of 1972 and released on the India Navigation label the following year. The album documents a performance of an extended composition by Leo Smith.

Author Bob Gluck referred to the first half of "Manhattan Cycles: Side One" as shifting from foregrounded solos to what he calls "parallel play," a technique at which the group excelled, and "a performance mode in which all three musicians pursued their own direction while contributing to a shared overall construction. The 'glue' for such performance is a combined energy level, density, texture, and sense of shared purpose." He noted that, due to the trio's cooperative orientation, "The Revolutionary Ensemble had no leader looking in from outside the hub of activity, no Miles Davis to limit musical forays from continuing until their logical end, however anarchic the journey."

Reception

The AllMusic review awarded the album 4 out of 5 stars.

A reviewer for Destination Out commented: "Recorded on New Year's Eve, 1972/73, there was doubtless plenty to be bombastic about at that time. But what we get instead is as un-bombastic as it gets. This is perhaps the most revolutionary aspect: no foreground, no background, a cooperative enterprise that enlists every technique at the artists' disposal... The entire performance is a model of interplay."

Track listing
All compositions by Leo Smith.
 "Manhattan Cycles: Side One" – 23:00
 "Manhattan Cycles: Side Two" – 18:00

Personnel
Leroy Jenkins – violin, viola
Jerome Cooper – drums, bugle, metal hoops, flute, tape recorder
Sirone − bass

References

India Navigation live albums
Revolutionary Ensemble live albums
1973 live albums